Aliabad-e Jowhari (also Romanized as ‘Alīābād-e Jowharī; also known as Sa‘dābād) is a village in Howmeh Rural District, in the Central District of Lamerd County, Fars Province, Iran. At the 2006 census, its population was 61, in 13 families.

References 

Populated places in Lamerd County